Tazeh Kand (also Romanized as Tāzeh Kand; also known as Ak-Zava, Āq Zawa, Āqzevaj, and Āqzūj)  is a village in Chavarzaq Rural District, Chavarzaq District, Tarom County, Zanjan Province, Iran. At the 2016 census, its population was112, in 34 families.

References 

Populated places in Tarom County